Meşeköy is a village in the İkizdere District, Rize Province, in Black Sea Region of Turkey. Its population is 281 (2021).

History 
Some of the villagers are ethnically Laz. Village is famous for Lazboard festival.

Geography

References

Villages in İkizdere District
Laz settlements in Turkey